"Spirit" is the seventh single released by British gothic rock band Bauhaus. It was released in 7" format by Beggars Banquet Records as a regular release with the band's distinctive logo on both sides (front black on white, back white on black) and as a picture disc in a clear vinyl pouch with white text printed on the reverse.

It peaked at No. 42 in the UK Singles Chart.

Track listing
"Spirit" 
"Terror Couple Kill Colonel (Live in Paris)"

References

External links
 
 AllMusic review

Bauhaus (band) songs
1982 singles
1982 songs
Songs written by Daniel Ash
Beggars Banquet Records singles
Song recordings produced by Hugh Jones (producer)